This is a list of Brazilian television related events from 1957.

Events

Debuts

Television shows

Births
18 February - Christiane Torloni, actress
20 May - Lucélia Santos, actress, director & producer
8 July - Françoise Forton, actress

Deaths

See also
1957 in Brazil